Melville is a historic home located near Surry, Surry County, Virginia.  It was built about 1727, and is a -story, hall-parlor plan brick dwelling.  It has a clipped gable roof with three pedimented dormers and features tall interior end chimneys. It has a frame shed roofed addition in the rear dated to the early-19th century and a screened front porch and wing dated to the early-20th century.

It was listed on the National Register of Historic Places in 1980.

References

Houses on the National Register of Historic Places in Virginia
Houses completed in 1727
National Register of Historic Places in Surry County, Virginia
Houses in Surry County, Virginia